Eva María Naranjo Molina (born 10 July 1978) is a Spanish boxer, kickboxer and Muay Thai fighter. She is the current WAKO World Bantamweight champion, and the former Enfusion -54 kg, WPMF World Super Flyweight and WMF World Super Flyweight champion.

She is also the former WBC International Bantamweight Champion.

Martial arts career
In March 2009, Naranjo fought Seda Aygün for the WAKO World Bantamweight title. She won the fight by unanimous decision.

She took part in the 2010 IFMA World Amateur Championships. She took the first place in the tournament.

In March 2015, Naranjo fought Kwanjai Sorporlor Chaiyaphum for the WPMF World Super Flyweight title. She won the fight by KO.

She was scheduled to fight Davinia Perez for the WBC International title, on June 29, 2018. Naranjo won the fight by a unanimous decision.

Following this victory, Naranjo was scheduled to fight Mariana Juárez for WBC World Bantamweight title on March 2, 2019. Juárez won the fight by unanimous decision.

Championships and accomplishments
Kickboxing
 2010 IFMA World Amateur Champion
 2013 Enfusion -54 kg Champion
 2015 WPMF World Super Flyweight Champion
 2015 WMF World Super Flyweight Champion
 2017 WAKO World Bantamweight Low Kick Champion

Boxing
 2018 WBC International Bantamweight Champion

Awards
 2010 Marina Baixa Best Professional Sportsman
 2010 Alicante Best Female Fighter
 2010 World Combat Games Best Muay Thai Fighter

Boxing record

Kickboxing record

|-  bgcolor="#fbb"
| 2015-04-18 ||Loss ||align=left| Anissa Meksen || Enfusion Live 27 || Tenerife, Spain || Decision (Unanimous) || 3 || 3:00
|-  bgcolor="#cfc"
| 2015-03-16 ||Win ||align=left| Kwanjai Sorporlor Chaiyaphum || WPMF World Title|| Bangkok, Thailand || KO ||  || 
|-
! style=background:white colspan=9 |
|-  bgcolor="#cfc"
| 2013-07-13 ||Win ||align=left| Iman Barlow || Enfusion Live 7 || Tenerife, Spain || Decision (Split) || 5 || 3:00
|-
! style=background:white colspan=9 |
|-  bgcolor="#cfc"
| 2009-03-27 ||Win ||align=left| Seda Aygün || WAKO World Title || Eskişehir, Turkey || Decision (Unanimous) || 5 || 3:00
|-
! style=background:white colspan=9 |
|-
| colspan=9 | Legend:

See also
 List of female boxers
 List of female kickboxers

References

1978 births
Living people
Sportspeople from the Province of Ciudad Real
Spanish kickboxers
Spanish Muay Thai practitioners